Christmas with Friends is a collaborative Christmas album by American singer India.Arie and American pianist Joe Sample. It was released on October 16, 2015, through Motown and Soulbird Music. Arie worked as one of the album's executive producers with American pianist John Burke and American musician Dave Koz. Sample contributed to four of the songs, but died from mesothelioma before the album's completion. After placing the project on hold for a year, Arie decided to collaborate with other artists to complete it.

Christmas with Friends consists of ten tracks, including nine covers of Christmas standards and carols, and one original song co-written by Arie's mother. Following the album's release, Arie promoted it in various venues, particularly through her Christmas with Friends Tour (2015). Christmas with Friends received a generally mixed critical reception. The album appeared on several Billboard charts. The album peaked at number 107 on the Billboard 200.

Background and recording
American singer-songwriter India.Arie and American pianist Joe Sample first met in 2012 during the Curaçao Jazz Festival. They worked together on music without much success; Arie said she was dissatisfied with their earlier work, explaining the songs "weren't coming together as quickly as I wanted". After attempting to collaborate on new music for two years, they decided to record a Christmas album together. Both artists had been asked by their families to make a Christmas album in the past.

Arie and Sample began working on Christmas with Friends in February 2014, with help from American producer Aaron Lindsey. Recording took place in a number of studios, including Harmony Studios, House of Blues Studios, Ocean Way Recording, and Sound Logic Recording Studio in California, India Song Studio in Georgia, Studio A Recording Inc. in Maryland, and Wire Roads Studio in Texas. Arie was one of the album's executive producers with American pianist John Burke and American musician Dave Koz.

Sample died from mesothelioma in September 12, 2014, before completing his parts for the album. When discussing her experience working with Sample in Houston, Arie said: "He was an older person who was dealing with health issues, but he was fun to be around." She dedicated Christmas with Friends to Sample with a message on the liner notes.

Following Sample's death, Arie put work on Christmas with Friends on hold for a year, after which she decided to contact multiple singers to complete the project. The artists who appear on the album are Kem, Brandy, Michael McDonald, Dave Koz, Tori Kelly, and Trombone Shorty. Describing the process she used to pair songs with potential collaborators, Arie said: "I sent several songs to each person and said 'do what you feel". Brandy had approached Arie when the album was nearly complete and said: "It ain't done until I'm on there! I need to be on 'Silent Night."

Composition and collaborations

Christmas with Friends comprises ten songs, nine of which are covers of Christmas standards and one is an original track. SoulTracks' Melody Charles viewed the track listing as "leisurely-paced". The midtempo "Favorite Time of Year" is the album's only original song. It was co-written by Arie's mother during a session in the recording studio with her daughter and Aaron Lindsey, and includes lyrics about Arie's family, such as how her mother created her stage clothing. She chose to cover "Merry Christmas Baby" as her grandmother had previously sung to her during her childhood.

Sample plays the piano on four of the album's songs: "Let It Snow", "Have Yourself a Merry Little Christmas", "Silent Night", and "The Christmas Song". Arie said that Sample's chord voicings had a deep impact on her approach for her vocals; she explained: "His piano playing was so nuanced and delicate, it made me want to sing in a way that would complement his aesthetic."

Music critics noted that the singers came from different artistic backgrounds, such as gospel, jazz, pop, contemporary R&B, soul, and rock. Francois Marchand of The Vancouver Sun identified the album's genre as "relaxed pop [and] R&B." Charles wrote that "Let It Snow" features "Sample's glib piano work and her feathery croon" and "The Christmas Song" as a "smoke-infused ditty". Arie's interpretations of "I've Got My Love to Keep Me Warm" and "Merry Christmas Baby" contain elements of ragtime and blues respectively. Her versions of "Let It Snow" and "God Rest You Merry, Gentlemen" incorporate a jazz sound, while her take on "Auld Lang Syne" includes an instrumental from American saxophonist Kirk Whalum.

Release and promotion
Christmas with Friends was released on October 16, 2015, through Motown and Soulbird Music. It was Arie's second studio album after a four-year hiatus. In a 2015 interview with Ebony, she said that it would be her only Christmas album. Christmas with Friends was Sample's final album before his death; when talking about her part in his career, Arie said: "It's an honor to be the gatekeeper to what we believe is his last recorded work."

Arie promoted the album by performing in a concert as part of the Hollywood Christmas Parade on December 11, 2015. She also embarked on the Christmas with Friends Tour (2015). The seven-city production started in Boston on December 13, 2015, with American musician Jonathan McReynolds serving as the opening act for five of its dates. A portion of the ticket sales was given to the National Museum of African-American Music. To promote the record further, Arie also appeared on The Steve Harvey Morning Show and Tavis Smiley in December 2015.

Reception 

Upon its release, Christmas with Friends received positive feedback from music critics. Praising Arie's performance as " a smooth maturity", The Southern Illinoisans Pablo Gorondi wrote that Sample lent the album a "jazz expertise". Sean L. Maloney of the Nashville Scene summed up the record as "a great big bundle of warm-and-fuzzies, a cozy cuddle by the fireplace on a cold night, and a holiday tradition in the makin". Philadelphia Weeklys Nerisha Penrose viewed it as composed of "nostalgic numbers that will warm listeners['] ears and hearts". The Los Angeles Times Randy Lewis described Christmas with Friends as "suitably warm", and Alan Sculley of the Daily Herald wrote that it showcased the potential for a Christmas album to be original.

Other critics had more mixed responses to the album. Despite wishing that Sample was featured on more songs, Andy Kellman of AllMusic praised the contributions from its various featured artists. He highlighted Arie's vocals "switching between the spiritual and playful material with natural ease", writing that she provides cohesion for all of the tracks. While she believed that the album needed more uptempo tracks, Melody Charles responded positively to Arie's vocals and her collaborations with the other artists. She wrote that the album "gift[ed] music lovers with a treat to the ears, and heart, long before that celebrated day arrives". Joe Szczechowski of Digital First Media praised Arie's approach to the album's various genres, but he criticized her tendency to rely on "runs and other vocal gymnastics when the song would be best served by simply carrying the tune".

Christmas with Friends reached a peak position on several Billboard charts for the week of December 26, 2015. It peaked at number 107 on the Billboard 200, and remained on the chart for four weeks. It reached number 78 on the Top Album Sales chart, and stayed on the chart for two weeks. The album peaked at number 19 on the Holiday Album Sales chart, and remained on the chart for a total of six weeks. Along with the album, Arie's cover of "Merry Christmas Baby" peaked at number 28 on the Billboard Hot 100 on January 9, 2016, and remained on the chart for one week.

Track listing 
Credits adapted from AllMusic.

Credits and personnel 
Credits adapted from AllMusic.

Management

Motown
Soulbird Music

Recording locations

Harmony Studios, West Hollywood, CA
House of Blues Studios, Encino, CA
India Song Studio, Atlanta, GA
Ocean Way Recording, Hollywood, CA
Sound Logic Recording Studio, Santa Barbara, CA
Studio A Recording, Inc, Dearborn Heights, MI
Wire Roads Studio, Houston, TX

Credits

Kory Aaron – vocal engineer
Troy "Trombone Shorty" Andrews – featured artist, trombone
Lou Baxter – composer
John Beasley – arranger, piano
Chuck Berghofer – bass
Irving Berlin – composer
Ralph Blane – composer
Brandy – featured artist, vocals
John Burk – executive producer
Sammy Cahn – composer
Teddy Campbell – drums
Mark Casselman – vocal engineer
Reuben Cohen – mastering
Steve Cook – A&R
David Delhomme – keyboards
Khristian Dentley – featured artist, vocal arrangement, vocals
Danny Duncan – engineer
Queen Cora Dunham – photography
Nathan East – bass, bass (upright)
Matthew Emonson – vocal engineer
Craig Fundyga – vibraphone
Buddy Greene – composer
Franz Grüber – composer
Hamilton Hardin – horn arrangements
India.Arie – composer, executive producer, primary artist, producer, vocals
Paul Jackson Jr. – guitar (acoustic), guitar (electric)
Tori Kelly – featured artist, vocals
Kem – featured artist, vocals
Gerrit Kinkel – engineer
Dave Koz – executive producer, featured artist, sax (tenor)
Aaron Lindsey – arranger, bass, bass (upright), composer, drums, editing, engineer, fender rhodes, instrumentation, keyboards, piano, producer, synthesizer, vocal engineer
Mark Lowry – composer
Hugh Martin – composer
Michael McDonald – featured artist, vocals
Rickey Minor – arranger, producer
Joseph Mohr – composer
Gene Moore – featured artist
Gene Moore Jr. – featured artist, vocals
Johnny Moore – Composer
Eric Morgeson – vocal engineer
Case Mundy – engineer
Seth Presant – assistant engineer
Rex Rideout – A&R
Salvo – mixing
Joe Sample – arranger, featured artist, piano, primary artist, producer
Nick Sample – bass (upright)
Allen Sides – engineer, mixing
India Arie Simpson – composer
Rob Skipworth – engineer, vocal engineer
Javier Solís – percussion
Ryan Staples – assistant engineer
John Stoddart – string arrangements
Jule Styne – composer
Mel Tormé – composer
Traditional – composer
Annalee Valencia-Bruch – art direction, design
Jeff "Tain" Watts – drums
Lenny Wee – assistant engineer
Robert Wells – composer
Kirk Whalum – featured artist, sax (tenor)
Timothy "Tip" Wyman – vocal engineer
Vivian Yohannes – A&R

Charts

Release history

Notes

References

External links 
 

2015 Christmas albums
Albums published posthumously
Christmas albums by American artists
Contemporary R&B Christmas albums
Covers albums
India Arie albums
Motown albums
Pop Christmas albums